Massimo Rizzo (born 14 March 1974) is a Swiss football manager and former player. He last managed Swiss club FC Zürich.

References

External links
 

1974 births
Living people
Swiss men's footballers
FC Wettingen players
FC Baden players
SC Young Fellows Juventus players
FC Wil players
FC Schaffhausen players
FC Zürich players
Association football defenders
Swiss Super League players
Swiss football managers
FC Zürich managers
Swiss Super League managers
FC Zürich non-playing staff